As Nature Made Him: The Boy Who Was Raised as a Girl is a biography of David Reimer, written by John Colapinto and published February 20, 2001, by Harper Perennial. Reimer was a Canadian man born male but raised as a girl following medical advice and intervention after his penis was severely injured during a botched circumcision in infancy.

In 2001, the book was a finalist for the Lambda Literary Award for Nonfiction.

Reception
As Nature Made Him was a New York Times best seller.

Reviews 
"Colapinto's storytelling, taut and emotive, never plays the grim tale for its sideshow qualities, nor claims the last word on nature versus nurture."

Awards

References 

2000 non-fiction books
American non-fiction books
Books by John Colapinto
English-language books